John Lie may refer to:

 John Lie (professor), professor of sociology at the University of California, Berkeley
 John Lie (Indonesian Navy officer) (1911–1988), navy commander and National Hero of Indonesia